In mathematics, Ladyzhenskaya's inequality is any of a number of related functional inequalities named after the Soviet Russian mathematician Olga Aleksandrovna Ladyzhenskaya.  The original such inequality, for functions of two real variables, was introduced by Ladyzhenskaya in 1958 to prove the existence and uniqueness of long-time solutions to the Navier–Stokes equations in two spatial dimensions (for smooth enough initial data).  There is an analogous inequality for functions of three real variables, but the exponents are slightly different;  much of the difficulty in establishing existence and uniqueness of solutions to the three-dimensional Navier–Stokes equations stems from these different exponents.  Ladyzhenskaya's inequality is one member of a broad class of inequalities known as interpolation inequalities.

Then there exists a constant  depending only on  such that, in the case :

and in the case :

Generalizations

 Both the two- and three-dimensional versions of Ladyzhenskaya's inequality are special cases of the Gagliardo–Nirenberg interpolation inequality

which holds whenever

Ladyzhenskaya's inequalities are the special cases   when  and  when . 

 A simple modification of the argument used by Ladyzhenskaya in her 1958 paper (see e.g.

See also

 Agmon's inequality

References

 
  []
 

Inequalities
Fluid dynamics
Sobolev spaces